Dance Hall Hostess is a 1933 American drama film directed by B. Reeves Eason and starring Helen Chandler, Jason Robards Sr. and Alberta Vaughn.

Cast
 Helen Chandler as Nora Marsh 
 Jason Robards Sr. as Jerry Raymond 
 Edward J. Nugent as Patrick Gibbs Jr. 
 Natalie Moorhead as Clare 
 Alberta Vaughn as Myra 
 Jane Keckley as Mrs. Gibbs 
 Ronnie Cosby as Donnie 
 Clarence Geldart as Sheriff

References

Bibliography
 Alan G. Fetrow. Sound films, 1927-1939: a United States filmography. McFarland, 1992.

External links

1933 films
American drama films
American black-and-white films
1933 drama films
Films directed by B. Reeves Eason
Mayfair Pictures films
1930s English-language films
1930s American films